Balkh Airlines was a short-lived airline headquartered in Mazar-i-Sharif, Afghanistan. From 1996 to 1997, it operated passenger flights out of Mazari Sharif Airport using a single Boeing 727-100, competing with Ariana Afghan Airlines.
The company had been founded to serve the needs of General Dostum, the Uzbek warlord ruling the north of Afghanistan at that time.

References

1996 establishments in Afghanistan
1997 disestablishments in Afghanistan
Defunct airlines of Afghanistan
Airlines established in 1996
Airlines disestablished in 1997